is a citrus-based sauce commonly used in Japanese cuisine.

The sour nature of this sauce led to the final  being written with the character , meaning "vinegar".

Ponzu is made by simmering mirin, rice vinegar,  flakes (from tuna), and seaweed over medium heat.

It is used as a dip for sashimi.

See also
 Japanese words of Dutch origin
 List of condiments

References

Japanese condiments
Sauces
Citrus dishes
Japanese words and phrases